Hydroxyquinol is an organic compound with the formula C6H3(OH)3.  It is one of three isomeric benzenetriols.  The compound is a colorless solid that is soluble in water.  It reacts with air to give a black insoluble solid.

Production
It is prepared industrially by acetylation of paraquinone with acetic anhydride followed by hydrolysis of the triacetate.

Historically, hydroxyquinol was produced by the action of potassium hydroxide on hydroquinone. It can also be prepared by dehydrating fructose.

C6H12O6   →   3 H2O + C6H6O3

Natural occurrence
Hydroxyquinol is a common intermediate in the biodegradation of many aromatic compounds.  These substrates include monochlorophenols, dichlorophenols, and more complex species such as the pesticide 2,4,5-T. Hydroxyquinol commonly occurs in nature as a biodegradation product of catechin, a natural phenol found in plants (e.g. by soil bacteria Bradyrhizobium japonicum). Hydroxyquinol is also a metabolite in some organisms. For instance, Hydroxyquinol 1,2-dioxygenase is an enzyme that uses hydroxyquinol as a substrate with oxygen to produce 3-hydroxy-cis,cis-muconate.

References